Elections to the Adur District Council were held on 3 May 1979, alongside the general election. The entire council was up for election, following boundary changes that reduced the number of wards by one, but all together had added two seats. Overall turnout was recorded at 74.4%.

The election resulted in the Conservatives gaining control of the council.

Election result

This resulted in the following composition of the council:

Ward results

References

1979
1979 English local elections
1970s in West Sussex